Paulo Jorge dos Santos Noga (born 3 September 1970) is a retired Angolan-born, Portuguese football defender.

References

1970 births
Living people
Portuguese footballers
GD Bragança players
Ermesinde S.C. players
U.D. Oliveirense players
Leça F.C. players
C.D. Feirense players
Association football defenders
Primeira Liga players